Laba, Łaba, or LABA may refer to:

Places
Laba River, in Russia
Bolshaya Laba River, in Russia 
Wadi Laba River, in Eritrea
Laba Forest, protected forest in Burkina Faso
Laba Township, in Lancang Lahu Autonomous County, Yunnan, China

People
Izabella Łaba (born 1966), Polish-Canadian mathematician
Kodjo Fo-Doh Laba (born 1992), Togolese footballer
Marianna Laba (born 1968), Ukrainian singer and musician
Matías Laba (born 1991), Argentine footballer
Roman Laba (born 1966), Ukrainian football striker
Laba Sosseh (1943–2007), Gambian son and salsa singer and composer

Other uses
Laba Festival, traditional Chinese holiday
Libera Accademia di Belle Arti (LABA), Italian academy of Fine Arts
Long-acting beta-adrenoceptor agonist (LABA), medication
Laba language

See also 
R v Laba